Trevor Ngwane is a South African socialist and anti-apartheid activist. He previously worked as a sociology lecturer at Wits University where he helped found the Wits Workers' School, to teach literacy to the campus cleaners and gardeners. He was the National Education Officer for the Transport & General Workers Union of the Congress of South African Trade Unions. In 1995 he was elected Ward Councillor for Pimville Zone 5 and 7, Soweto, on an African National Congress ticket. In 1999 he was expelled by the ANC for opposing the City of Johannesburg Metropolitan Municipality's privatization of municipal services. In 2001, he helped found the Soweto Electricity Crisis Committee and then the Anti-Privatisation Forum in 2002, which both campaign against the privatisation of public services. He is a member of the Socialist Group.

Selected articles 
 South Africa in 2010: A History That Must Happen, Socialist Project, 11 November 2010.
 Socialists, the Environment and Ecosocialism, MRZine, 20 November 2009.
 Letter from South Africa, Socialist Review, September, 2009.

External links 
 Trevor Ngwane's blog

References 

Living people
South African activists
South African Trotskyists
South African trade unionists
Year of birth missing (living people)